Michael Sidney Timpson (born February 26, 1970 in Mountain View, California) is an American composer of contemporary classical music.

Early life and education

Timpson was born and grew up in Silicon Valley, California at the height of the computer age.  Although still regularly frequenting that area, he has also lived in Los Angeles, Upstate New York, Michigan, Kansas, Memphis, England, and Taiwan.  Most recently he resided in Tampa, Florida before moving to Seoul, Korea in August 2010.

A child of the multicultural era in Northern California, he was intrigued with Japanese, Korean, Southeast Asian, and Oceanic traditional music in his formative years; seeds that would eventually bear a lasting impact on his musical style. In recent years, with his research on Chinese instruments, he has become a doubler/improviser on various Chinese wind instruments, such as suona, guanzi, yamudi, dizi, xiao, chiba, xun, koudi, bawu, hulusi, sheng, hulusheng and other related instruments from Asia and the Middle East.

He earned a BM at the University of Southern California, an MA at the Eastman School of Music, and a DMA at the University of Michigan; his notable teachers include Samuel Adler, William Albright, William Bolcom, Morten Lauridsen and Joseph Schwantner.

Career

Although clearly a composer of the concert art-music genre, his definitive style combines elements of European, American, and Asian musical sources.  His music is written for nearly every medium, including orchestral, chamber, band, percussion, electronic, vocal, and even non-western instruments.  His two most well-known and performed compositions are Chasin’ Bill for Chinese silk and bamboo ensemble and CRUSH for soprano saxophone and Chinese Guzheng.

The nature of his music is eclectic, stemming from maximalism to minimalism, modernism to postmodernism, and fluidly combines tonality and atonality.

His musical beginnings were borne out of playing baritone saxophone and bass clarinet, often manipulating the latter instrument with guitar pedals; he was also co-founder of the group Jazz on the line with fellow saxophonists Rent Romus (Aaron Repke) and Dan Magay.  This led to a strong interest in American improvisational forms, especially Cool Jazz, Progressive Bebop, Free Jazz, and non-commercially oriented Jazz Fusion.  He would later evolve incorporations and influences of funk, new wave, heavy metal, new jack swing, electronica, trip hop, and shibuya-kei into his music.

He has recently been appointed as Associate Professor of Music Composition at Ewha Womans University in Seoul, Korea.  He is a former faculty member in the same fields at University of South Florida, University of Kansas and Rhodes College and in 2009, was a Senior Fulbright Research Scholar (Humanities) in Taipei, Taiwan to write a book on orchestration for Chinese instruments.  A musical style that merges American jazz and pop, Asian traditions and the European avant-garde, his compositions have been featured throughout the United States, France, Czech, Ukraine, Canada, Japan, and Taiwan. Timpson won the ASCAP Grant for Young Composers, the BMI Student Composers Award, the DownBeat Magazine award for extended composition, and was twice nominated for the American Academy of Arts and Letters composition award.  He also won the Brian M. Israel Prize (The Society for New Music and the New York Federation of Music Clubs), the Lee Ettelson Composer’s Award, National Federation of Music Club’s Youse competition, second places at the Music From China International Competition and in NACUSA (National Association of Composers of The United States of America)’s composition competition, very highly commended in England’s Kathryn Thomas Flute Competition, and honorable mention at the National Federation of Music Club’s Beyer competition.
His compositions appear on Albany/Capstone, CRS, NACUSA, and ERM recording labels, and have been published by World-Wide-Music. Three of his works were recorded by the Kiev Philharmonic and a fourth by the Chinese National Film Orchestra. His works were premiered in Carnegie Hall, Merkin Hall, and Taiwan National Concert Hall, and his orchestral compositions were premiered by The Florida Orchestra and the Jacksonville Symphony Orchestra. Timpson’s works have also appeared on radio shows throughout the U.S., Asia, and Europe.  His music is published by HoneyRock Music and American Composers Editions.

References 

 Michael Sidney Timson page at Chinesezheng.com (archive from 11 October 2008, accessed 28 January 2018).
 http://mysite.verizon.net/resquw01 
 https://web.archive.org/web/20100621190822/http://music.arts.usf.edu/bio_timpson.html
 http://www.myspace.com/michaeltimpson

American male composers
21st-century American composers
Living people
1970 births
Academic staff of Ewha Womans University
Pupils of Samuel Adler (composer)
University of Michigan School of Music, Theatre & Dance alumni
21st-century American male musicians